Jihad: A Story of the Others  is a 2015 documentary film by Norwegian director Deeyah Khan. The film is produced by Khan's production company Fuuse.  Jihad is the outcome of a two-year investigation by Deeyah and provides a view from the inside about what it is like to be drawn into radicalism. The documentary film sets out to provide an insight into why some young Muslims in the West embrace violent extremism and go abroad to fight holy wars and in some cases why they came to reject it.

The film received its world premiere on ITV in the UK through its current affairs strand Exposure under the title Jihad A British Story.

Synopsis

The documentary looks at the intimate, personal reasons individuals are drawn into that world and how some find their way out of it.  The film also shows that Westerners embracing jihad is nothing new and has been going on since the 1980s.

In Jihad, Deeyah meets one of the godfathers of the British and Western jihadi movement, who went abroad to fight, and who preached extremism to thousands of young Muslims across the UK and the West.

Deeyah’s search for answers then takes her to the streets of modern Britain, meeting today’s young Muslims, caught between extremism and the War on Terror.  She meets young British Muslims who feel angry and alienated, facing issues of discrimination, identity crises and rejection by both mainstream society and their own communities and families; but in surprising moments of insight and enlightenment, she also finds hope and some possible answers to the complex situation we are currently in.

Accolades

References

External links

Norwegian documentary films
British documentary films
2015 television films
2015 films
Documentary films about jihadism
Films directed by Deeyah Khan
2015 documentary films
British television documentaries
Islamism in the United Kingdom
2010s British films